INIS is a 7-bit subset of ASCII developed by the International Nuclear Information System (INIS). It has MIB 51 and is also known as iso-ir-49 and csISO49INIS.

Character set

See also 
ISO 646 § Variant comparison chart
INIS-8

References 

Character sets
International Atomic Energy Agency